Amsterdam Tulip Museum (2004) ATM is a privately owned museum in Amsterdam. The museum features exhibits about Tulips. The museum is in a canal house, along the Prinsengracht canal.

History
The museum was established in 2004 in a canal house in the Jordaan neighborhood of Amsterdam. The museum was started by three Dutch bulbsmen and it is privately owned. One of the museum's founders is hollands largest tulip bulb mail-order operations in the United States, Colorblends Bridgeport. One of the other founders providing funding is Fluwel, a European bulb supplier. The museum is located across the bridge from the Anne Frank House.

It has  of floor space and the exhibits in the museum trace the history of the tulip from its origins in the Himalayas to its arrival arrival in the court of the Ottoman Sultan Suleiman the Magnificent (1494-1566).

The museum features an exhibit which explores the famous Tulip mania of the 1630s. The tumultuous Tulip trade led to one of history's most infamous market crashes. The museum also features exhibits of Ottoman-style Tulip-themed art and ceramics, bulb industry artifacts and films about tulips. The Tulip Museum shop sells Dutch flower bulbs. The museum has multimedia presentations which are viewable on LCD screens.

See also
List of museums in Amsterdam
List of museums in the Netherlands
List of most visited museums in the Netherlands

References

External links
Video - Short film for Tulip Museum Amsterdam

Amsterdam Museum
Museums in Amsterdam
2022 establishments in the Netherlands
Tourist attractions in Amsterdam
21st-century architecture in the Netherlands